Three Valley Gap is an unincorporated settlement on the Trans-Canada Highway adjacent to the lake of the same name. It is located 27 km southwest of Revelstoke, just west of the summit of Eagle Pass. The three valleys of the name include the eastern and western egresses from the pass and a southward opening into the upper reaches of Wap Creek, which is a northern tributary of the Shuswap River.

The 3 Valley Lake Chateau and Heritage Ghost Town is located here. The facility includes a 200-room hotel, a collection of heritage buildings, an antique car museum, enclosed railway roundhouse with antique rail car exhibit, and attached grounds with helicopter tours offered. The attraction is closed during the winter months.

References

External links

Three Valley Gap Chateau photo

Columbia Country
Unincorporated settlements in British Columbia
Populated places in the Columbia-Shuswap Regional District